A Crusade song is any vernacular lyric poem about the Crusades. Crusade songs were popular in the High Middle Ages: 106 survive in Occitan, forty in Old French, thirty in Middle High German, two in Italian, and one in Old Castilian. The study of the Crusade song, which may be considered a genre of its own, was pioneered by Kurt Lewent. He provided a classification of Crusade songs and distinguished between songs which merely mentioned, in some form, a Crusade from songs which were "Crusade songs". Since Lewent, scholars have added several classifications and definitions of Crusade songs. Scholars have argued for three different classifications of Crusade songs which include songs of exhortation, love songs, and songs which criticize the Crusading movement.

The Crusade song was not confined to the topic of the Latin East, but could concern the Reconquista in Spain, the Albigensian Crusade in Languedoc, or the political crusades in Italy. The first Crusade to be accompanied by songs, none of which survive, was the Crusade of 1101, of which William IX of Aquitaine wrote, according to Orderic Vitalis. From the Second Crusade survive one French and ten Occitan songs. The Third and Fourth Crusades generated many songs in Occitan, French, and German. Occitan troubadours dealt especially with the Albigensian campaigns in the early thirteenth century, but their decline thereafter left the later Crusades—Fifth, Sixth, Seventh, and Eighth—to be covered primarily by the German Minnesänger and French trouvères.

List of Occitan crusading songs
The following list is only of those songs defined as "Kreuzlied" in Lewent, "Das altprovenzalische Kreuzlied" (Berlin: 1905). It is important to note that Lewent only lists the Crusade songs that have a call to crusade. For a more complete list, see the new database by Paterson.

List of French crusading songs
The following table is adapted from Smith, Age of Joinville, p. 17, who cites Les chansons de croisade, eds J. Bédier and P. Aubry (Paris, 1909), p. xxxv.

German crusade songs
The following Minnesänger are known to have composed crusade songs:

Walther von der Vogelweide: Palästinalied, Elegy
Tannhäuser: Kreuzlied
Friedrich von Hausen
Albrecht von Johansdorf
Heinrich von Rugge
Hartmann von Aue
Freidank: Akkonsprüche
Neidhart

Castilian crusade songs
Only one vernacular crusade song is known from the Iberian Peninsula. Discovered in the second half of the twentieth century, Ay, Jherusalem! is a planto or lament in Castilian. It is recruitment propaganda probably connected either with the First Council of Lyon in 1245 or the Second Council of Lyon in 1274. The anonymous poet laments the plight of the Christians and the cruelty of the Muslims. In form, it consists of stanzas of five lines (two dodecasyllables and three hexasyllables) with the last line always ending in the refrain (estribillo) "Iherusalem".

Notes

Bibliography

Cammarota, Maria Grazia. "Tannhäuser's Crusade Song: A Rewriting of Walther's Elegy?". In M. Buzzoni and M. Bampi (eds.), The Garden of Crossing Paths: The Manipulation and Rewriting of Medieval Texts. Venice: Libreria Editrice Cafoscarina, 2005. pp. 95–118.
Choin, Victoria. The Poets, the Popes, and the Chroniclers: Comparing Crusade Rhetoric in the Songs of the Troubadours and Trouvéres with Crusade Literature, 1145–1291. Master's thesis. Arizona State University, 2019.
Dijkstra, Cathrynke (1995). La chanson de croisade: étude thématique d'un genre hybride. Amsterdam: Schiphouwer en Brinkman.

Jordan, W. C. (1998). « Amen ! » Cinq fois « Amen ! ». Les chansons de la croisade égyptienne de Saint Louis, une source négligée d'opinion royaliste Médiévales 34: 79–90 .
Lewent, Kurt (1905). "Das altprovenzalische Kreuzlied." Romanische Forschungen, 21(2):321–448. 
Paterson, Linda M. (2003). "Lyric allusions to the crusades and the Holy Land." Colston Symposium. 
Paterson, Linda M. "Occitan Literature and the Holy Land." The World of Eleanor of Aquitaine: Literature and Society in Southern France between the Eleventh and Twelfth Centuries, edd. Marcus Bull and Catherine Léglu. Woodbridge: Boydell Press, 2005. .
Paterson, Linda (2018). Singing the Crusades. French and Occitan Responses to the Crusading Movements, 1137–1336. Cambridge: D. S. Brewer.
Routledge, Michael (2001). "Songs". The Oxford Illustrated History of the Crusades, ed. Jonathan Riley-Smith. Oxford: Oxford University Press. .

Smith, Caroline. Crusading in the Age of Joinville. Routledge, 2016.